Lovebird is the common name for the genus Agapornis, a small group of parrots in the Old World parrot family Psittaculidae. Of the nine species in the genus, all are native to the African continent, with the grey-headed lovebird being native to the African island of Madagascar.

Social and affectionate, the name comes from the parrots' strong, monogamous pair bonding and the long periods which paired birds spend sitting together.
Lovebirds live in small flocks and eat fruit, vegetables, grasses, and seeds. Black-winged lovebirds also eat insects and figs, and black-collared lovebirds have a special dietary requirement for native figs, making them difficult to keep in captivity.

Some species are kept as pets, and several coloured mutations have been selectively bred in aviculture. The average lifespan is 20 to 30 years.

Description

They are among the smallest parrots, characterised by a stocky build, a short blunt tail, and a relatively large, sharp beak. Wildtype lovebirds are mostly green with a variety of colours on their upper body, depending on the species. The Fischer's lovebird, black-cheeked lovebird, and the masked lovebird have a prominent white ring around their eyes. Many colour mutant varieties have been produced by selective breeding of the species that are popular in aviculture.

Taxonomy
The genus Agapornis was introduced by the English naturalist Prideaux John Selby in 1836. The name combines the Ancient Greek αγάπη agape meaning "love" and όρνις ornis meaning "bird". The type species is the black-collared lovebird (Agapornis swindernianus). The genus contains nine species of which five are monotypic and four are divided into subspecies. They are native to mainland Africa and the island of Madagascar. In the wild, the different species are separated geographically.

Traditionally, lovebirds are divided into three groups:
the sexually dimorphic species: Madagascar, Abyssinian, and red-headed lovebird
the intermediate species: peach-faced lovebird
the white-eye-ringed species: masked, Fischer's, Lilian's, and black-cheeked lovebirds
However, this division is not fully supported by phylogenetic studies, as the species of the dimorphic group are not grouped together in a single clade.

Species and subspecies:

Rosy-faced lovebird, Agapornis roseicollis, (Vieillot, 1818)—or peach-faced lovebird
 Agapornis roseicollis catumbella, B.P. Hall, 1952
 Agapornis roseicollis roseicollis, (Vieillot 1818)
Yellow-collared lovebird, Agapornis personatus, Reichenow, 1887—or masked lovebird
Fischer's lovebird, Agapornis fischeri, Reichenow, 1887
Lilian's lovebird, Agapornis lilianae, Shelley, 1894—or Nyasa lovebird
Black-cheeked lovebird, Agapornis nigrigenis, W.L. Sclater, 1906
Grey-headed lovebird, Agapornis canus, (Gmelin, 1788)—or Madagascar lovebird
 Agapornis canus ablectaneus, Bangs, 1918
 Agapornis canus canus, (Gmelin, 1788)
Black-winged lovebird, Agapornis taranta, (Stanley, 1814)—or Abyssinian lovebird
Red-headed lovebird, Agapornis pullarius, (Linnaeus, 1758)—or red-faced lovebird
 Agapornis pullarius pullarius, (Linnaeus, 1758)
 Agapornis pullarius ugandae, Neumann, 1908
Black-collared lovebird, Agapornis swindernianus, (Kuhl, 1820)—or Swindern's lovebird
 Agapornis swindernianus emini, Neumann, 1908
 Agapornis swindernianus swindernianus, (Kuhl, 1820)
 Agapornis swindernianus zenkeri, Reichenow, 1895

Species

Nesting
Depending on the species of lovebird, the female will carry nesting material into the nest in various ways. The peach-faced lovebird tucks nesting material in the feathers of its rump, while the masked lovebird carries nesting material back in its beak. Once the lovebirds start constructing their nest, mating will follow. During this time, the lovebirds will mate repeatedly. Eggs follow 3–5 days later. The female will spend hours inside her nesting box before eggs are laid. Once the first egg is laid, a new egg will follow every other day until the clutch is complete, typically at four to six eggs. Even without a nest or a male, lovebirds sometimes produce eggs.

Feral populations

Feral populations of Fischer's lovebirds and masked lovebirds live in cities of East Africa. There are interspecific hybrids that exist between these two species. The hybrid has a reddish-brown head and orange on upper chest, but otherwise resembles the masked lovebird.

Feral lovebirds have been observed in many parts of the Southwestern United States, including Arizona and Texas. Several species are also found in feral populations in Southern California.

There are two feral colonies present in the Pretoria region (Silver Lakes, Faerie Glen and Centurion) in South Africa. They probably originated from birds that escaped from aviaries. They consist mostly of masked, black cheeked, Fischer and hybrid birds and vary in colours. White (not albino) and yellow as well as blue occur in many cases. The white ringed eyes are very prominent.

Aviculture 

With their inclination to bond, lovebirds can form long-term relationships with people as well as other lovebirds. Aggression is easily aroused in lovebirds, however, and they may bite unless humans establish a bond with gentle handling. Provided with adequate space, a stimulating environment, and appropriate nutrition, lovebirds can become companion parrots. They snuggle with and will often preen their favorite people.

It is preferable to obtain birds bred in captivity, rather than birds caught in the wild. Wild birds may harbor diseases such as avian polyomavirus. Captured wild lovebirds also may mourn the loss of association with a mate or a flock.  Their age is likely to be unknown, and they may have an unsuitable personality for domestication. Lovebirds are no longer imported from the wild to the United States. Birds socialised from a very early age, while being brought up by parents, make very good pets. The practice of hand-feeding young psittacines, including lovebirds, outside of a medical emergency has been outlawed in the Netherlands since 1 July 2014 and lovebird chicks should stay with their parents until they can eat independently, at minimum 55 days after hatching. However, single birds require frequent attention to stay happy, and if the owner has limited time to spend daily with a single lovebird, it is preferable to give the lovebird a companion of the same species, or a companion of another parrot species known to get along well with lovebirds. It is important to use wide cages as large as possible.

Few lovebirds talk, but many will not: there is a chance they may learn to mimic human sounds if taught to do so at a young age. Lovebirds are noisy, with calls ranging from cheerily pleasant to highly irritating; in the wild, parrots must call to each other over long distances to keep flocks together, and it is through such signals that they make most of their communication. It is best to spend frequent, short periods of time with a lovebird, rather than having just one or two interactions every day.

Sexual characteristics and behaviour
Determining the sex of a lovebird is difficult. At maturity of one year, it may show signs of whether it is male or female, such as ripping up paper and stuffing it into its feathers (female behaviour) or regurgitating for its owners (male behaviour: the male feeds the nesting female). This behaviour is not a reliable indicator, however. The only sure method is DNA testing; however, some experts can sex lovebirds by feeling beneath the body.  There are two sharp points beneath the cloaca known as the pelvic bone. If the points are nearer together, the bird is male; if the points are further away, it is female (females must have a larger pelvis to lay eggs).

Housing and environment

Lovebirds require an appropriately sized cage or aviary. Minimum recommended space per bird is 1 m×1 m×1 m. Lovebird's beaks are made of keratin, which grows continuously. Chewing and destroying wood toys and perches helps to keep beaks trim. Cuttlebones help provide beak-trimming and a source of calcium and other necessary minerals. Natural perches and special rough surfaced perches of varying diameters placed at different levels in the cage will allow greater climbing mobility and gives them a choice to select the most comfortable spot to roost. They also require plenty of toys, such as willow branches, swings, tunnels, boxes and safe things to chew on and play with.

Lack of toys, keeping the birdcage covered too many hours, and lack of companionship or social stimulation may lead to boredom, stress and psychological or behavioral problems (nervousness, aggression, feather-plucking, screaming, depression, immunosuppression). Lovebirds are social birds and will enjoy several hours of interaction a day. Without this interaction, daily exercise, a roomy cage/aviary, and many toys to play with, they may resort to feather-plucking or screaming, and both behaviors can be difficult to cure. If the owner leaves the house, they should leave a radio or TV set playing to provide sound for the bird. Lovebirds are intelligent, and if a relationship is to form they need a human who will dedicate much time to them. Lovebirds enjoy baths and like to sun themselves daily.

Grooming
As with pet parrots in general, the tips of lovebirds' toenails should wear down adequately by the parrot climbing over rough surfaced perches. If the parrot has an inactive lifestyle the toenails may grow long and need to be trimmed. Only the very tips of the toenails are trimmed. If too much of a toenail is trimmed away, it will be painful and bleed from the blood vessels in the centre of the nail. This bleeding should be stopped as soon as possible with the use of styptic gel or powder. Sharp pointed toenails can be blunted by simply filing the point. These procedures are usually done with the help of an assistant carefully holding the parrot wrapped in a towel.

Diet in captivity 

A fresh mix (with or without dehydrated fruits and/or vegetables) of excellent quality combining various seeds, grains and nuts generally represent the typical basic diet. Ideally the basic mix will contain or will be supplemented with an about 30% portion of any bio/organic (naturally coloured and flavoured and without any conservative agent) and/or of any natural (naturally coloured, flavoured and preserved) pellets. Parrot species (including cockatiels) are biologically vegetarian species. Consequently, they should be fed vegetarian diets that are ideally supplemented with vegetable proteins provided by the combination of any type of wholegrain/cereal with any type of legume/pulse.

Aggression problems with other birds and animal species
Because of their dominant and territorial nature, lovebirds should be supervised when socialising with other species and genera (whether it be cat, dog, small mammal or other bird species). Lovebirds may be aggressive to other birds, even to other lovebirds. Hand-raised lovebirds tend not to be scared and pose even more of a threat to themselves. Toe biting may occur when lovebirds are socialising/housed with small birds (i.e. parrotlets, budgies, and even docile cockatiels). They should not be housed with other bird genera as they can be injured or pose a threat to other birds.

Pets and bird safety
Lovebirds are very vocal birds, making loud, high-pitched noises. Some make noise all day, especially during dawn and dusk. This is a normal parrot behaviour as flock animals, where they are calling to each other before the start of the day and just before they settle down for the night.

Lovebirds are also very active and love to chew things. When they are flying within a household, it is wise to watch them carefully and protect any furniture, electrical wiring or anything else that they could possibly chew on. Try to place fresh willow or oak branches in a favourite spot (e.g. near a high/sunny platform) to satisfy this natural behaviour. Other things to be aware of when keeping lovebirds (also applies to other pet birds) at home are the danger spots in the house, such as open toilet bowls for drowning, clear glass walls which might be rammed in full force by the bird, fumes from all Teflon or anti-stick coating in the kitchen, microwave coatings, oven coatings and chemical fumes from regular household cleaning products. Interaction with other pets in the house must also be supervised, such as cats and dogs which may view the lovebird as a prey animal.

Lovebirds of different species can mate and produce both sterile and fertile hybrid offspring, for example Agapornis personatus mate with Agapornis fischeri will produce fertile hybrid offspring. These offspring have behaviours of both parents. For this reason it is recommended to only place birds of the same species together, or of the same sex.

There are two lovebird societies in the United States: the Agapornis Breeders and Exhibitors and the African Love Bird Society.

References

Further reading
 All About Breeding Lovebirds (hardcover) by Mervin Roberts
 Lovebirds: Everything About Housing, Care, Nutrition, Breeding, and Diseases with a special chapter, "Understanding Lovebirds" (A Complete Pet Owner's Manual) by Matthew M. Vriends
 Lovebirds compendium by Dirk Van den Abeele

External links 
 

 
A
Parrots
Parrots of Africa
Taxa named by Prideaux John Selby
[Budgies lifespan]
[Budgies Bite]